Rodney is an unincorporated community in Gallia County, in the U.S. state of Ohio.

History
Rodney was platted in 1830. A post office called Rodney was in operation from 1839 until 1985.

References

Unincorporated communities in Gallia County, Ohio
Unincorporated communities in Ohio